Lesley Arfin (born 1979) is an American comedy writer and author.

Life
Arfin was born to a Jewish family in 1979 in Long Island, New York. She grew up in the same complex in Woodbury, Nassau County, New York, as writer Gabe Rotter and they both attended Syosset High School. She attended Hampshire College.

Career
Lesley Arfin was a contributor to Vice from 2001, but left in 2007, after publication of her book Dear Diary, based on a column she wrote for Vice magazine, which was published by Vice Books. In 2008, she became the editor-in-chief of Missbehave.

Arfin went on to become a staff writer for the HBO TV series Girls. From there, she worked on the TV series Brooklyn Nine-Nine. Arfin received sole writing credit for the Halloween-themed episode in the first season.

With Paul Rust and Judd Apatow, she created the Netflix series Love. Arfin drew on her own past in dealing with alcohol addiction while writing for Love.

Arfin is currently the host of the Earios podcast Filling the Void, about hobbies that bring people joy. She also wrote and executive produced Season 1 of the HBO series Betty, which was released in 2020.

Personal life
Arfin wrote about being addicted to heroin and going to rehab in her book Dear Diary.

Arfin married actor and writer Paul Rust in 2015. In October 2017, she gave birth to their daughter, Mary James.

Bibliography
Dear Diary,

References

External links 

American television writers
People from Woodbury, Nassau County, New York
Syosset High School alumni
Writers from New York City
1979 births
Living people
Hampshire College alumni
21st-century American women writers
American women television writers
American comedy writers
20th-century American Jews
Screenwriters from New York (state)
21st-century American screenwriters
21st-century American Jews
20th-century American women